is a sub-kilometer asteroid, classified as a near-Earth object of the Aten group. It has only been observed during 5 days in February 1993, and not been detected ever since.

Orbit 

 was first observed on 17 February 1993, by the Spacewatch survey at Kitt Peak Observatory in Arizona, United States. From 1993 to 1998, it was the asteroid with the lowest known aphelion at 1.023 AU, and was thus the closest thing to an Apohele asteroid known at the time. It currently orbits the Sun at a distance of 0.8–1.0 AU once every 11 months (331 days). Its orbit has an eccentricity of 0.09 and an inclination of 12° with respect to the ecliptic.

Description 

However,  was lost before the orbit could be confirmed, so  retained the title of the asteroid with the lowest known aphelion. However,  lost its smallest aphelion title almost immediately when  (aphelion of 1.014 AU) was discovered only a few weeks later on 8 December 1998.

For comparison, the distance to the Moon is about 0.0026 AU (384,400 km). Because the orbit was determined with only 5 days worth of observations, the orbit of  has an uncertainty of 6 on a scale of 0 to 9, with 0 being the most certain, and 9 being the most uncertain. This uncertainty is common for small asteroids that are difficult to observe.

References

External links 
 List Of Aten Minor Planets (by designation), Minor Planet Center
 
 
 

Minor planet object articles (unnumbered)
19930217